The Štiavnica is a river in southern central Slovakia. It flows through Banská Štiavnica, Krupina and Levice districts, and through the town of Banská Štiavnica. It enters the Ipeľ river west of Šahy as a right tributary.

See also
Minor planet 22185 Štiavnica

References

Rivers of Slovakia